Paul Chittilapilly (7 February 1934 – 6 September 2020) was a bishop of the Syro-Malabar Catholic Church.

Chittipilly was born in Mattom in the Thrissur district of Kerala and was ordained to the priesthood in 1961. Following his return from the Pontifical Lateran University in Rome, he was appointed professor at St. Thomas’ Apostolic Seminary in Kottayam. In 1978, he was appointed vicar general of the Archeparchy of Thrissur.

He served as bishop of the Eparchy of Kalyan from 1988 to 1996 and as bishop of the Eparchy of Thamarassery from 1996 to 2010.

Notes

1934 births
2020 deaths
Syro-Malabar bishops